On 7 May 2013, a tanker truck carrying liquefied petroleum gas lost control and ran into several cars and houses before it exploded on Federal Highway 85 in San Pedro Xalostoc community in Ecatepec de Morelos, Mexico. 27 people were killed and more than 30 injured as a result of the accident. The resulting fires damaged 45 homes and 16 vehicles.

Background

Prior to 2012, Mexican transport trucks were allowed to carry up to 80 metric tons of cargo, roughly double the limit in the United States or Europe. A series of deadly accidents, including one in April 2012 that killed 43 people, led to protests and calls for reform. In response, the federal government lowered the maximum amount of weight allowed to be carried on freight vehicles by about 4.5 tons. However, such accidents remain common. Compounding the danger, homes are often built on cheap land within a few feet of major highways.

Accident

As a result of the accident, 27 people were killed, including 10 children, and another 31 people were injured. Among the dead was a family of four, including two children aged 11 and 6. Twenty-three people were hospitalized, eight of them in serious condition. Many of the casualties were asleep in their homes along the edge of the road at the time of the accident.

The blast led to extensive fires which damaged 45 homes and 16 vehicles. Local media reports described the area as resembling a "war zone". "It was a ball of fire which exploded as though they'd put a spotlight in the whole window," said an eyewitness. "We opened the door and it was like fire had blown through the whole of the garden." Roughly 100 people were left homeless by the accident. Several animals were killed by the explosion, but some others were rescued. Although Pemex was not involved in the crash, the company said it would help with rescue efforts.

According to early reports, the driver of the tanker, Omar Díaz Olivares, allegedly was speeding and lost control of his vehicle. He then crashed into several cars and homes before the tanker exploded. Díaz was taken to the local hospital, where he was arrested. The highway remained closed for five hours, but later a few highway lanes were opened. According to Díaz' declaration, he lost control of the tanker after he tried to evade a minivan.

Aftermath
President of Mexico Enrique Peña Nieto requested the Secretariat of Communications and Transportation, as well as Mexico Civil Protection System, to investigate the causes of the accident. Eruviel Ávila, governor of the State of Mexico, returned to Mexico. Ávila was on an official visit to Vatican City, but after the explosions he decided to cancel his trip. He announced state government-paid funeral expenses of the families of the victims, and affected people will receive MXN$50,000 (about US$5,000) to "rebuild their homes", and MXN$25,000 (about US$2,000) to buy home appliances. The company Termogas, owner of the truck, announced they will be responsible for damages, if their truck was the cause of the accident. Alfredo Martínez Torres, Secretariat of Urban Development of the State of Mexico, announced at least 110 families that live near the highway will be relocated.

See also
1978 Los Alfaques Disaster
1992 Guadalajara explosions

References

2013 in Mexico
2013 road incidents
Explosions in 2013
Ecatepec de Morelos
Explosions in Mexico
Road incidents in Mexico
May 2013 events in Mexico
Tanker explosions